Staffoli is a separate fraction of the municipality of Santa Croce sull'Arno, which is situated in the province of Pisa, Tuscany.

Its population in 2005 was about 3,000 people, spread in a territory of less than 4 square kilometers, surrounded by cultivated fields and woods.

External links

Frazioni of the Province of Pisa